Transcription factor 15 is a protein that in humans is encoded by the TCF15 gene.

Function

The protein encoded by this gene is found in the nucleus and may be involved in the early transcriptional regulation of patterning of the mesoderm. The encoded basic helix-loop-helix protein requires dimerization with another basic helix-loop-helix protein for efficient DNA binding. [provided by RefSeq, Jul 2008].

References

Further reading